Maksim Aleksandrovich Kutovoy (born 1 July 2001) is a Russian football player. He plays as a centre-forward for FC Krasnodar and FC Krasnodar-2.

Club career
He made his debut in the Russian Professional Football League for FC Krasnodar-2 on 16 May 2018 in a game against FC Afips Afipsky. He made his Russian Football National League debut for Krasnodar-2 on 17 July 2018 in a game against FC Sibir Novosibirsk.

He made his Russian Premier League debut for FC Krasnodar on 12 July 2020 in a game against FC Ural Yekaterinburg, replacing Wanderson in the 85th minute.

Career statistics

References

External links
 
 
 

2001 births
People from Slavyansk-na-Kubani
Sportspeople from Krasnodar Krai
Living people
Russian footballers
Russia youth international footballers
Association football forwards
FC Krasnodar-2 players
FC Krasnodar players
Russian Premier League players
Russian First League players
Russian Second League players